The Trials of Rumpole is a collection of short stories by John Mortimer adapted from scripts for his TV series about Horace Rumpole.

The stories are:
"Rumpole and the Age for Retirement"
"Rumpole and the Case of Identity" 
"Rumpole and the Course of True Love"
"Rumpole and the Fascist Beast"
"Rumpole and the Man of God"
"Rumpole and the Showfolk"

References

Works by John Mortimer
1979 short story collections